Ahvaz is a city in the southwest of Iran and the capital of Khuzestan province. Ahvaz's population is about 1,300,000 and its built-up area with the nearby town of Sheybani is home to 1,136,989 inhabitants. It is home to Persians, Arabs, Bakhtiaris, Dezfulis, Shushtaris, and others.

One of the 2 navigable rivers of Iran alongside the Arvand Rud (Shatt al-Arab), the Karun, passes through the middle of the city. Ahvaz has a long history, dating back to the Achaemenid period. In ancient times, the city was one of the main centers of the Academy of Gondishapur.

Etymology
The word Ahvaz is a Persianized form of the Arabic "Ahwaz," which, in turn, is derived from an older Persian word. The Dehkhoda Dictionary specifically defines the "Suq-al-Ahvaz" as "Market of the Khuzis", where "Suq" is the Elamite word for market, and "Ahvaz" is a broken plural of the form "af'āl" of the word "Huz" or "هوز", which itself comes from the Persian Huz, from Achaemenid inscriptions where the term first appears. Thus, "Ahvaz" in Persian means "the Huz-i people", which refers to the Khuzi original inhabitants of Khūzestān.

The term "Huz", meanwhile, is the Old Persian rendition of Suz (Susa-Susiana), the native Elamite name of the region. See Origin of the name Khuzestan and Elam#Etymology for more details.

History

Ancient history
Ahvaz is the analog of "Avaz" and "Avaja" which appear in the Achaemenid emperor Darius's epigraph. This word also appears in the Naqsh-Rostam inscription as "Khaja" or "Khooja".

First named Ōhrmazd-Ardašēr (Persian:  Hormozd ardeshir), Ahvaz was built near the beginning of the Sassanid dynasty on what historians believe to have been the site of the old city of Taryana, a notable city under the Persian Achaemenid dynasty, or the city of Aginis referred to in Greek sources where Nearchus and his fleet entered the Pafitigris. The city was founded either by Ardashir I in 230 (cf. Encyclopædia Iranica, al-Muqaddasi, et al.) or (according to the Middle Persian Šahrestānīhā ī Ērānšahr (shahrestān hā-ye Irānshahr)) by his grandson Hormizd I; the city’s name either combined Ardashir's name with the Zoroastrian name for God, Ōhrmazd, or Hormizd's name with that of his grandfather. It became the seat of the province, and was also referred to as Hūmšēr. During the Sassanid era, an irrigation system and several dams were constructed, and the city prospered. Examples of Sassanid-era dams are Band-e Bala-rud, Band-e Mizan, Band-e Borj Ayar and Band-e Khak. The city replaced Susa, the ancient capital of Susiana, as the capital of what was then called Khuzestān.

The city had two sections; the nobles of the city lived in one part while the other was inhabited by merchants. When Arabs invaded the area in 640, the part of the city home to the nobility was demolished but the Hūj-ī-stānwāčār "Market of Khūz State", the merchant area, remained intact. The city was therefore renamed Sūq al-Ahwāz, "Market of the Khuz", a semi-literal translation of the Persian name of this quarter - Ahwāz being the Arabic broken plural of Hûz, taken from the ancient Persian term for the native Elamite peoples, Hūja (remaining in medieval khūzīg "of the Khuzh" and modern Khuzestān "Khuz State", as noted by Dehkhoda dictionary).

Medieval history
During the Umayyad and Abbasid eras, in Ahvaz flourished as a center for the cultivation of sugarcane and as the home of many well-known scholars. It is discussed by such respected medieval historians and geographers as ibn Hawqal, Tabari, Istakhri, al-Muqaddasi, Ya'qubi, Masudi, and Mostowfi Qazvini. Nearby stood the Academy of Gundishapur, where the modern-day teaching hospital is said to have been first established.

Ahvaz was devastated in the Mongol invasions of the 13th and 14th centuries and subsequently declined into a village. The dam and irrigation channels, no longer maintained, eroded and finally collapsed early in the 19th century. During this time Ahvaz was primarily inhabited by the original Khuzhis and a small number of Sabians. Although most Arab migrants fled the city, a few stayed. Some minor cultivation continued, while all evidence of sugarcane plantations is still going on in the Haft Teppe area north of Ahvaz, although ruins of sugarcane mills from the medieval era remained in existence. Several ruins of water mills also still remain in Shush and Shushtar.

Modern history 
The seat of the province has, for most of its history, been in its northern reaches, first at Susa (Shush) and then at Shushtar. During a short spell in the Sasanian era, the capital of the province was moved to its geographical center, where the river town of Hormuz-Ardashir (modern Ahvaz). However, later in the Sasanian time and throughout the Islamic era, the provincial seat returned and stayed at Shushtar, until the late Qajar period. With the increase in the international sea commerce arriving on the shores of Khuzestan, Ahvaz became a more suitable location for the provincial capital. The River Karun is navigable all the way to Ahvaz (above which, the Karun flows through rapids). The town was thus refurbished by the order of the Qajar king, Naser al-Din Shah and renamed after him, Nâseri. Shushtar quickly declined, while Ahwaz/Nâseri prospered to the present day.

In the 19th century, "Ahwaz was no more than a small borough inhabited mainly by Sabeans (1,500 to 2,000 inhabitants according to Ainsworth in 1835; 700 according to Curzon in 1890)."

In the 1880s, under Qajar rule, the Karun River was dredged and re-opened to commerce. A newly built railway crossed the Karun at Ahvaz. The city again became a commercial crossroads, linking river and rail traffic. The construction of the Suez Canal further stimulated trade. A port city was built near the old village of Ahvaz, and named Bandar-e-Naseri in honor of Nassereddin Shah Qajar.

Oil was found near Ahvaz in the early 20th century, and the city once again grew and prospered as a result of this newfound wealth. From 1897 to 1925, the city of Ahwaz was in the hands of heshmatoddoleh Ghajar, who acted as governor and Sarhang Reza Gholi Khane Arghoon commander of Ghajari's army based in Khuzestan. Sheikh Khaz'al was recognized by Mozaffar ad-Din Shah Qajar as hereditary ruler of Mohammerah, Sardar Asad Bakhtiari as the most powerful leader of Khuzestan's Bakhtiaries. He had power and authority over most regions of Khuzestan, such as Dezful, Shushtar, Izeh, even Ahwaz and Amir mojahede bakhtiari in Ramhormoz and Behbahan. At this time, the newly founded Ahwaz was named Nâseri in honour to its founder Nassereddin Shah Qajar. Afterwards, during the Pahlavi period, it resumed its old name, Ahwaz. The government of the Khūzestān Province was transferred there from Shûshtar in 1926. The Trans-Iranian Railway reached Ahwaz in 1929 and by World War II, Ahwaz had become the principal built-up area of the interior of Khūzestān. Professional segregation remained well marked between various groups in that period still feebly integrated: Persians, sub-groupings of Persians and Arabs. Natives of the Isfahan region held an important place in retail trade, owners of cafes and hotels and as craftsmen.

Iraq attempted to annex Khūzestān and Ahvaz in 1980, resulting in the Iran–Iraq War (1980–1988). Ahwaz was close to the front lines and suffered badly during the war.

Iraq had pressed its claims to Khūzestān. Iraq had hoped to exacerbate ethnic tensions and win over popular support for the invaders. Most accounts say that the Iranian Arab inhabitants resisted the Iraqis rather than welcome them as liberators. However, some Iranian Arabs claim that as a minority they face discrimination from the central government; they agitate for the right to preserve their cultural and linguistic distinction and more provincial autonomy. See Politics of Khūzestān.

In 1989, the Foolad Ahwaz steel facility was built close to the town. This company is best known for its company-sponsored football club, Foolad F.C., which was the champion of Iran's Premier Football League in 2005.

In 2005 the city witnessed a series of bomb explosions. Many government sources relate these events to developments in Iraq, accusing foreign governments of organizing and funding Arab separatist groups. The Arab Struggle Movement for the Liberation of Ahwaz claimed credit for several of the bombings, including four bombs on 12 June 2005, that killed 8 people.

Gunmen killed at least 29 people in an attack on a crowd watching a military parade on 22 September 2018.

Bridges 
There are 9 bridges over the Karun river.

Pol-e Siah (Black Bridge) 

Black Bridge, also known as Victory Bridge, is the first bridge over of Ahvaz. The bridge was used in WWII to supply Allies in Soviet Union and it had a vast impact in Allies victory.

White Bridge 

White Bridge (Persian: پل سفید), is an arch bridge completed on the 21st of September 1936 and inaugurated on the 6th of November 1936. The bridge remains a symbol of the city still today.

The other 7 bridges are :

Third bridge, Naderi bridge, Fifth bridge, Sixth bridge, Seventh bridge (also named Dialogue among civilizations bridge), Cable bridge, and Ninth bridge.

Location and roads
Ahvaz is located 100 km north-east of Abadan and is accessible via following routes in addition of a single runway airport:
Tehran-Khorramshahr national railway
 Ahvaz-Abadan expressway (145 km)
 Ahvaz-Andimeshk (152 km) expressway
 Ahvaz-Bandar Imam Khomeini freeway (175 km).

Ahvaz, being the largest city in the province, consists of two distinctive districts: the newer part of Ahvaz which is the administrative and industrial center, which is built on the right bank of the Karun river while residential areas are found in the old section of the city, on the left bank.

Climate

Ahwaz has a subtropical hot desert climate (Köppen climate classification BWh) with long, hot summers and cool, short winters. Summer temperatures are regularly at least  sometimes exceeding  with many sandstorms and duststorms common during the summer period. Winters in Ahvaz have no snow. The average annual rainfall is around 230 mm. On June 29, 2017, the temperature reached . Despite the fact that it has never snowed in Ahvaz, it has fallen down to  before.

People 

According to the 2016 census, the city had an estimated population of 1.1 million people.

Languages 

Based on a survey taken by the Iranian ministry of culture in 2010, the most common languages in Ahvaz are Persian (44.8%), Arabic (35.7%), and Bakhtiari (15.8%). Many Ahvazis are bilingual, speaking both Persian and one of the following languages/Dialects. The indigenous inhabitants of Ahvaz speak Khuzestani Persian dialect that is unique to Khuzestan, and rooted in old Persian and Elamite languages. The Arabic spoken in Ahvaz is a variety of Khuzestani Arabic. Another part of Ahvazis speak Bakhtiari dialect of Luri language. Modern Mandaic (or Mandaee) language is also spoken among the Mandaeans of Ahvaz. It is a descendant of the  Classical Mandaic language that has been partially influenced by Khuzestani Persian.

Pollution
In 2011, the World Health Organization ranked Ahvaz as the world's most air-polluted city. The reason Ahvaz is so polluted is because of its oil industry. The pollution can be very dangerous, causing different types of diseases, and can be harmful to plants.

Transportation

Airport 
Ahvaz International Airport (IATA: AWZ, ICAO: OIAW) (Persian: فرودگاه بین‌المللی اهواز) is an airport serving the city of Ahvaz, Iran.

Railway 

Ahwaz railway station (Persian: ايستگاه راه آهن اهواز, Istgah-e Rah Ahan-e Ahvaz) is located in Ahvaz, Khuzestan Province.

 Ahwaz is accessible via freeways from Isfahan and Shiraz, and roadways to Tehran.
A metro urban railway system is being built by the Ahvaz urban railway. The system is planned to have a total of four lines. Line 1 will be a 23 km underground line with 24 stations.

Sport 
Traditionally, Khuzestan province has been a major soccer hub in Iran. The city has two existing sport complexes: Takhti Stadium and the newly constructed Ghadir Stadium. There are several other smaller complexes for martial arts, swimming pools and gymnasiums. Also, a new privately owned stadium is currently under construction by Foolad F.C. in Ahvaz.

Football

Football is a major part of the city's culture. The abundant enthusiasm has made Ahvaz home to three Iranian major Football clubs: Foolad, Esteghlal Khuzestan are currently playing in the Persian Gulf Pro League, and Esteghlal Ahvaz is playing in Azadegan League.

Foolad have won the league on two occasions, the 2013–2014 season and the 2004–2005 season. Esteghlal Ahvaz finished runners–up in the league in the 2006–2007 season. In 2016, Esteghlal Khuzestan won the league for the first time.

A number of other teams such as Foolad B the second team of Foolad and Karun Khuzestan play in the 2nd Division.

Futsal
Ahvaz has also two teams in the Iranian Futsal Super League, which are Sherkat Melli Haffari Iran FSC and Gaz Khozestan FSC.

Colleges and universities
Ahvaz is also known for its universities as well as its role in commerce and industry. Ahvaz institutes of higher learning include:

 Ahvaz Jundishapur University of Medical Sciences
 Petroleum University of Technology
 Shahid Chamran University of Ahvaz
 Islamic Azad University, Ahvaz Branch
Islamic Azad University - Science & Research Branch, Khuzestan
Institute for Higher Education ACECR Khouzestan
Payame Noor University of Ahvaz
Amiralmoemenin University
Rahnama Institute of Higher Education

Notable people

 Ahmad Mahmoud, Persian novelist
 Ali Sajadi Hoseini, filmmaker
 Ali Shamkhani, Iranian Minister of Defense (1997–2005)
 Amir Taheri, Iranian conservative author
 Ezzat Negahban, patriarch of modern Iranian archaeology
 Hamed Haddadi, NBA basketball player
 Hamid Dabashi, intellectual historian, cultural and literary critic
 Hamid Zangeneh, economist, author, and activist
 Hossein Kaebi, national football player
 Hossein Karimi, bodybuilder
 Jabbar Choheili, Mandaean priest
 Jalal Kameli Mofrad, national football player
 Manuchehr Shahrokhi, Professor of Finance, California State University; Editor, Global Finance Journal; Executive Director, Global Finance Association-Conference
 Meamar, Iranian artist
 Mehdi Yarrahi, Iranian Musician
 Mehrangiz Kar, human rights activist
 Mohammad Ali Mousavi Jazayeri, former Wali-Faqih representative in Khuzestan, former Ahwaz Friday Imam
 Mohammad Hossein Adeli, Iranian economist and diplomat
 Mohammad-Reza Eskandari, Iran's former Minister of Agriculture
 Muhammad ibn Falah, theologian
 Parviz Abnar, Iranian Sound recordist
 Patrick Monahan, Irish Iranian comedian
 Saleh Hosseini, Translator, Critic, Professor of English Literature
 Siavash Ghomayshi, Musician, Singer and Songwriter
 Sousan S. Altaie, PhD Scientific Policy Advisor, OIVD CDRH, FDA

Gallery

See also

 Ahvaz Field
 Choqa Zanbil
 Elam
 Gundeshapur
 History of Iran
 Khūzestān Province
 Mandaeism, Mandaic language
 Politics of Khūzestān
 Susa
 Takhti Stadium (Ahvaz)
 Rahian-e Noor
 Al-Ahvaz TV

References

External links

 Foolad Ahvaz Football Club 

Arab settlements in Khuzestan Province
Ardashir I
Cities in Khuzestan Province
Iranian provincial capitals
Populated places in Ahvaz County